Merrifieldia farsi is a moth of the family Pterophoridae described by Ernst Arenberger in 1981. It is found in Azerbaijan and Iran.

The ground colour is dirty white. Adults have been recorded in June.

References

Moths described in 1981
farsi
Moths of the Middle East